The Ministry of the Solicitor General (formerly known as the Ministry of Community Safety and Correctional Services) is the ministry in the Government of Ontario responsible for public security, law enforcement and policing, emergency management, correctional and detention centres/jails and organizations such as the Ontario Provincial Police, Emergency Management Ontario, and the Office of the Fire Marshal.  

The minister responsible is Michael Kerzner, Solicitor General of Ontario.

History

Law Enforcement and Public Safety 

Prior to 1972, the Attorney General and the Department of Justice had carriage of the responsibility for policing and public safety in the province.

The Ministry of the Solicitor General was established in 1972. Although there was no solicitor general of Ontario prior to 1972, one did exist for both the Province of Upper Canada (1791–1840) and the Province of Canada (1841–1867). With the re-organization of the Government of Ontario in 1972, however, this long-dormant office was re-established.

Correctional Services 

The Board of Inspectors of Asylums and Prisons, first appointed in 1859, was charged with general superintendence of the United Provinces' (i.e. Canada East/Quebec and Canada West/Ontario) 61 public institutions. These included 52 common gaols, the largest single type of institution, 4 lunatic asylums, 2 hospitals, 2 reformatory prisons, and one large penitentiary. Five inspectors were appointed and each one assigned an inspection district.

After Confederation, the Prisons and Asylums Inspection Act was passed on March 4, 1868. It vested control of all the above types of institutions located in Ontario, 49 in total, in the Office of the Inspector of Prisons and Asylums in the Department of the Provincial Secretary. On June 20, 1868, J.W. Langmuir was appointed first incumbent of the office.

In 1876, this office was renamed the Office of the Inspector of Prisons and Public Charities, and it became part of the Treasury Department. It was reverted to the Department of the Provincial Secretary in 1883. In addition to prisons, the office was also responsible for the superintendence of various public institutions that served social service functions, such as orphanages, houses of refuge, asylums for the insane, and hospitals. By 1925, the Inspector and his staff were responsible for superintending 380 institutions. Between 1927 and 1934, the provincial government gradually reduced the inspectorial functions and reassigned them to more specialized departments. For example, administration of charitable institutions was transferred to the newly created Department of Public Welfare in September 1930, and the responsibility for hospitals and sanatoria was transferred to the Department of Health in October 1930.

In 1934, the former Inspection Branch of the Provincial Secretary's Department became the Reformatory and Prisons Branch, the only Branch from the former inspectorate to remain in the Provincial Secretary's Department.

In 1946, the branch was elevated to department status, becoming the Department of Reform Institutions in the cabinet of Premier George Drew. The first minister was George Dunbar, whose first act was to create six work farms around the province. In the following decade, the development of its administrative structure reflected the evolution from punitive custody to correctional services. In 1954, a director of rehabilitation, chief parole and rehabilitation officer, and a chief psychologist were added, followed by a director of neurology and psychiatry in 1955. Other offices and services created within the department included the director of social work and the chaplaincy services.

On July 1, 1968, the department was renamed the Department of Correctional Services. The first minister was Allan Grossman, who said the change was made to update the service to reflect changes in attitudes to penal institutions. Prison guards were issued new uniforms that removed aspects of militarism from their appearance.

With the April 1972 reorganization of the Ontario government, the Department of Correctional Services was renamed the Ministry of Correctional Services. It took over the responsibility for probation services in 1972 from the Ministry of the Attorney General. In 1977, the Children’s Services Division was transferred to the Ministry of Community and Social Services. In 1984, with the passage of the federal Young Offenders Act, the ministry assumed responsibility for detention and parole of young offenders aged 16 and 17.

Merger of the two functions 

The Ministry of the Solicitor General and Correctional Services was formed on February 3, 1993, from the merger of the Ministry of the Solicitor General with the Ministry of Correctional Services. The two functions were separated again between 1999 and 2002.

In April 2002, the two functions merged again, and the newly created ministry was renamed as the Ministry of Public Safety and Security. This was done in the aftermath of the 2001 terrorist attacks. The new ministry encompassed correctional services as well as a new emphasis on border security. In 2003, the ministry was renamed to the Ministry of Community Safety and Correctional Services. In April 2019, the solicitor general role was re-introduced, and the ministry's name was reverted to the Ministry of the Solicitor General.

Security guard and private investigator licensing
In 2010, the ministry began to administer tests for new applicants and existing security guard or private investigator cardholders. Prior to 2010, any individual (as long as they were free, or pardoned, of a criminal charge) could obtain one or both licences just by paying 80 dollars for each. The new requirements came after a coroner's inquest into the death of Patrick Shand, who died from asphyxiation while in the custody of an untrained private security guard and staff at a Loblaws store in Scarborough. Despite the store chain's policy of prohibiting use of force against shoplifters, Shand was restrained and handcuffed. Shand remained handcuffed when staff had to perform CPR after the former went into respiratory arrest. The handcuffs were not removed until Shand was placed in an ambulance 18 minutes after the 911 call was made.

In response to the inquest's recommendations, applicants for security guard or private investigator licences must pass a 40-hour training course before writing a test. 62.5% is a passing grade for security guards and 77% for private investigators.

List of Ministers 

The position of Solicitor-General dates back to the foundation of Upper Canada, and also Canada West in the Province of Ontario, the predecessors to the current province of Ontario.

Solicitors-General of Upper Canada 
 Robert Isaac Dey Gray 1795–1804
 G. D'Arcy Boulton 1804–1814
 Sir John Beverley Robinson 1815–1818
 Henry John Boulton 1818–1829
 Christopher Alexander Hagerman 1829–1837
 William Henry Draper 1837–1839

Solicitors-General of Canada West
 Robert Baldwin, February 10, 1841 – June 14, 1841
 Henry Sherwood, July 23, 1842 – September 16, 1842
 James Edward Small, September 26, 1842 – December 11, 1843
 Henry Sherwood, October 7, 1844 – June 30, 1846
 John Hillyard Cameron, July 1, 1846 – March 10, 1848
 William Hume Blake, April 22, 1848 – September 30, 1849
 John Sandfield Macdonald, December 14, 1849 – November 11, 1851
 John Ross, November 12, 1851 – June 21, 1853
 Joseph Curran Morrison, June 22, 1853 – September 10, 1854
 Henry Smith, September 11, 1854 – February 24, 1858
 George Skeffington Connor, August 2, 1858 – August 6, 1858
 J.C. Morrison, February 22, 1860 – March 17, 1862
 James Patton, March 27, 1862 – May 23, 1862
 Adam Wilson, May 24, 1862 – May 10, 1863
 Lewis Wallbridge, May 16, 1863 – August 12, 1863
 Albert Norton Richards, December 26, 1863 – January 30, 1863
 James Cockburn, March 30, 1864 – June 30, 1867

Solicitors-General of Ontario

See also

List of provincial correctional facilities in Ontario

References

External links
  

1972 establishments in Ontario
Ontario government departments and agencies
Law enforcement agencies of Ontario
Ontario, Community Safety and Correctional Services
Ontario
Emergency management in Canada
Solicitors general